The Big 12 Conference Baseball Coach of the Year is a baseball award given to the most outstanding baseball head coach in the Big 12 Conference, as chosen by Big 12 coaches.

Key

Winners

Winners by school

See also
 Big 12 Conference Baseball Player of the Year
 Big 12 Conference Baseball Pitcher of the Year

References

NCAA Division I baseball conference coaches of the year
Coach
Awards established in 1997